The 117th district of the Texas House of Representatives contains parts of western San Antonio. The current Representative is Philip Cortez, who was first elected in 2016.

References 

117